Acanthocis is a genus of tree-fungus beetles in the family Ciidae.

Species
 Acanthocis inonoti Miyatake, 1955
 Acanthocis quadridentatus Nobuchi & Wada, 1959

References

Ciidae genera